Terrigal is an electoral district of the Legislative Assembly in the Australian state of New South Wales. It is represented by Adam Crouch of the Liberal Party. It includes the eastern suburbs of the Central Coast Council, formerly part of the City of Gosford.

History
Terrigal was created at the redistribution prior to the 2007 election and consisted of much of the district of Gosford, then held by Chris Hartcher for the Liberal Party, while Gosford absorbed most of the former district of Peats, then held by Marie Andrews for the Labor Party. Antony Green describes the redistribution as effectively being that Gosford was renamed Terrigal while Peats was renamed Gosford.

Since 2015, it has been the only seat on the Central Coast held by the Liberal Party.

Members for Terrigal

Election results

References

External links

Terrigal
Terrigal
2007 establishments in Australia